Tension may refer to:

Science
 Psychological stress
 Tension (physics), a force related to the stretching of an object (the opposite of compression)
 Tension (geology), a stress which stretches rocks in two opposite directions
 Voltage or electric tension, the difference in electric potential energy between two points

Entertainment
 Tension (music), the perceived need for relaxation or release created by a listener's expectations
 Suspense, the feeling of uncertainty and interest about the outcome of certain actions an audience perceives
 Tension (film), a 1949 film by John Berry
 Tension (Taiwanese band), a Taiwanese a cappella group and boy band
 Tension (hardcore band), an American hardcore punk band

Albums
 Tension (Dizmas album), a 2007 album by Dizmas
 Tension (Bakufu Slump album), 1994
 Tension (Die Antwoord album), 2012

Songs
 "Tension", a song by Avenged Sevenfold from Diamonds in the Rough
 "Tension", a song by Jack & Jack from A Good Friend Is Nice
 "Tension", a song by Killing Joke from What's THIS For...!
 "Tension", a song by Korn from The Path of Totality
 "Tension", a song by Orbital from The Altogether
 "Tension", a song by Scullion from the 1980 album Balance and Control
 "Tension", a song by Susumu Hirasawa from Paranoia Agent Original Soundtrack
 "Tension (Interlude)", a song by Børns from Blue Madonna

Other uses
 Tension (knitting), a factor that affects knitting gauge
 Tenseness, in phonetics, a phonological quality frequently associated with vowels and occasionally with consonants
 Muscle tone or residual muscle tension, a partial contraction of the muscles
 The Void (video game), also known as Tension in some regions

See also
 Stress (disambiguation)